Winninger is a surname. Notable people with the surname include:

Charles Winninger (1884–1969), American stage and film actor
David Winninger (born 1949), Canadian provincial politician
Ray Winninger, American game designer